Bryn (English: Hill) is a village and community in Neath Port Talbot County Borough in Wales. It has a population of 913. The name of the village now familiarly 'Bryn', is Bryntroedygam. So wrote the first vicar of St Theodore's in Port Talbot. There was a farm situated above Meadow Row named Bryn-Troed-y-Garn as shown on the 1876 OS map, as many more immigrants came to 'Bryntroedygam' it seemed the name of the village was to be shorted to Bryn. 12% of the village (112 out of 913 people) speak Welsh.
The population rose to 923 by 2011.

Coal mine

Its clear from the OS maps from the last century that Bryn was honeycombed with coal resources. Some of these could be in the form of outcrops which could be hand picked from the surface, it is likely that farmers would pick these for domestic, although such pickings belonged to the landlord and not the farmer tenant.

Deeds relating to Margam Abbey indicated that the monks were exploiting coal measures in or near Bryn about the year 1250, although coal mining in Bryn did not operate on any scale until the 18th century. It is believed that the copper miner at Cwmavon extended their operations to Bryn soon after 1841, at the time when this kind of coal for copper smelting was becoming more scarce in the Afan valley. The location is not certain, although the first Vicar of St Theodore's Church 'D J Jones' refers to the site as Drysiog Farm. In order to move this vast amount of coal to the copper works, a mineral railway was constructed. The bed of the railway can still be traced by turning at the Carmel church and following the line adjacent to Bryngurnos Street and along the B4282 towards Cwmavon.

The production of coal in the village caused a huge expansion in housing with a population in the 1841 census of 111 to a population of 558 in 1851. To provide for the huge increase the collieries a rapid housing programme began with 15 dwellings in 1841 to 96 in 1851. The familiar street names Bryn farm cottages, Buck Row, Yard Row and Farteg Row appeared, and so did a street called Wain Row, which transformed into Cross Row and Meadow Row.

The Downward slope of the economic activity in Bryn towards the end of the 19th century can be gauged from a comparison of the maps of 1876 and 1900, the 1876 map shows a high point in job prospects with the following mines in operation.

Bryngurnos Colliery (Drift mine)
Bryn colliery ( A level)
Drysiog ( 3 levels)
Bryntroedygarn ( 2 levels)

By 1900 the position had clearly declined. Bryngurnos colliery and Bryn colliery are described as 'disused' and the Drysiog and Bryntroedygarn were described as 'old levels'. On the plus side a new coal mine above meadow row brought many jobs.

Bryn Navigation Collieries Co. began sinking this colliery in the mid-1890s. The coal tip above Meadow row was called 'Amy', some say it is named after 'Amy Johnson' the first women aviator to fly solo from England to Australia others say it is named after one of the machines there.  Later the owners were listed as Messrs Baldwin's Ltd. then Thomas Richard & Baldwin's Ltd. In 1908 there were 380 men employed, producing House and Manufacturing coal. By 1918 the workforce had grown to 650. From a list 1923 there were 683 men employed, producing from the Middle and Lower seams. Later a drift was driven to become the main conveyance. In 1945 there were 615 men employed here. At its peak annual production was 96,000 tons. It closed in 1964.

In total 'The Coal Authority' hold three abandonment plans which are indexed as Drysiog Mine, these being numbers 16, 5856 and SW.295. Examination of these gives the following information

No.16 This Mine worked the Blackband Seam before being abandoned in April 1873. The Owners at the time of abandonment are given as The Governor and Company of Copper Miners in England whose address at that time was given as Cwm-Avon Works, Tribach.

No.5856 This plan shows workings in the White Seam which were abandoned on 30 May 1912 due to being unprofitable. The Owners at the time of abandonment were given as Parc-y-Bryn Colliery Company of then Station Road, Port Talbot. The plan is signed by Philip T Jenkins, Owner and Surveyor.

No. SW.295 This plan shows workings in the Tormynydd Seam and on the plan it is stated that the workings were re-opened in May 1952 (note this seam had previously been worked between 1923 and 19 September 1924 as the Parc-y-Bryn Colliery). Workings ceased on 16 July 1957 and the Mine finally abandoned in September 1957 due to being uneconomic. The Owners at the time of abandonment were given as The Drysiog Colliery Company but the Guide to the Coalfields for the years 1952 and 1953 give the then owner as a J.W. Heycock. Unfortunately, these editions give no indication as to manpower but the 1957 edition lists the manpower as 4. The plan is signed by John Perry Bevan (Director) and Gomer Hughes (Surveyor)

On 13 December 1994 a grant of up to 20,000 pounds sterling to New Parc Fuels Limited towards the development of a coal mine at Bryn Newydd, Port Talbot was Commissioned.

Education

Bryn has had four schools at various locations during the village's lifetime. 

The first school (a works school) was originally believed to have been established by the Bryn Colliery Company in the 1840s. However, the school was actually established by the governor and owner of Cwmavon Copper Works which opened Bryn's first colliery and constructed cottages to house the new workers. 
An article in The Cambrian Newspaper makes reference to the school but no information as to its location is mentioned or available because survey and census records at that time only recorded board schools and not work schools.

The second school in Bryn (built 1885 and demolished 1900) named 'The Bryn Elementary Board School' was located at the top of Meadow Row. 
The school was built on land leased to the school board by CRM Talbot. A 99 year lease was issued 29th September 1885 at a cost of 5 shillings per annum. 
Miss Margret Williams was appointed Headmistress of the new school on 7th November 1885 with a salary of £40 per annum to be paid from 1 January 1886. However, Miss Williams tenure was short-lived due to the expiration of her provisional teaching certificate. Consequently, Miss Williams vacated her position 21st September 1886. 
Advertisements for a successor, at a salary of £60 per annum were published in various newspapers and attracted eighteen applications. The successful candidate was Miss Emily Griffiths of Maesteg who took up her new post 16 October 1886. 
However, the school only survived for 15 years due to numerous construction and maintenance issues. During its short life, indications of construction weaknesses included:

25 November 1886 - Storm damage to the roof.

5 July 1889 - Tenders were obtained for the replacement of wooden eave troughs with more sturdy iron versions. 

15 August 1890 - Repairs were required to the pine end of the building

18 March 1892 - East side of the building was found to be extremely damp. 

By 5th December 1898 plans for a new school (Third) had been submitted by the architect 'Frank B Smith' to the Margam School Board. 
Three sites were offered by Charlotte Emily Talbot for a lease of 99 years at the cost of between £20 - £25 depending on the location. Trail holes were created and the site by St Tydfil's Church was selected; that building was intended for 254 pupils (60 infants and 194 aged 7+). The cost of construction would be around £8 per pupil or £2509 18s and 8d in total. The opening date of the school was fixed for 17 June 1900, whilst the old school above meadow row would close the week before to allow staff to move books and stationary; new furniture was bought at the cost of £2034 13s 0d was provided. Worries arose in May 1905 because of teachers travailing to Bryn by the PTR (Port Talbot Railway) and the matter of train times meant they would arrive late, the decision to open the school at 9:30am rather than 9:00am meant the teachers could travel on the train that would arrive in Bryn at 9:35am. The other incident was when one of the 'babies' in 1908 fell from the boundary wall to the road below. The fact that the student received very few injuries was miraculous.

The fourth school in Bryn was a mixed school of Non-Denominational religion for children of primary school aged 4 to 11 and also contained a nursery for children of pre-school age. In the 1960s it was exceptional for a new school to be built to replace an existing school. Despite this being the case, a new school was built which was opened in April 1968 by Lord Heycock following an enquiry that established the cost of upgrading and repairing the previous school would be almost double the cost of a new building. Some £17,000 was needed to fix the dampness in the old school which turned into a crisis in the 1960s. The search for land proved uneasy as the only piece of flat land was on the upper fringe of the village. In 1989 the school had only 46 pupils in attendance but figures had increased to the 90s by the 2000s. However, due to perceived low pupil numbers, a decision was made by the local education authority in 2014 to close the school and it officially shut its gates on 31 August 2015.

On 26 November 2008 Bryn primary school won the People's Millions on ITV for the amount of £49,431.

Local government

Bryn is one of 19 local community councils and is part of the 'Bryn and Cwmavon' division for Neath Port Talbot County Borough Council. Its served by three councillors.

Transport

Bryn in the beginning had only farm tracks with no means of 'modern' transport, if you click at the 'Stone' link below you will come across a picture that shows the only mile marker stone in the Glamorgan district that was not found on a tarmac road; the stone is the only one found in Bryn just to the west of a place called Penhydd Fawr and at SS 80572/93031 between Bryn and Pontrhydyfen; it would have been an important route between Neath and Bridgend. It was not until 1898 that Bryn was able to enjoy a more modern mode of transport when the railway was laid from Port Talbot via Bryn and then Maesteg through the Cwmcerwin tunnel. The whole idea for the construction was needed, as colliery owners in the Afan valley needed a better way to transport coal because of the increased tonnage. Sending the coal to Porthcawl became inadequate. A delay in the already started railway to Barry took 11 years, which worried the colliery owners, and so the PTR was constructed. The Cwmcerwin tunnel which still exists today has long been boarded up, but you can still see the red-bricked archway and the letters "PTR" and the date '1897'. The Bryn station behind the Royal Oak was a mile away from the tunnel, which was 1,012 yards long. It closed in 1964 and its engineering code was (PTP 508). The old track can clearly be seen today; the tunnel had a hump where the 1-in-40 gradient from Port Talbot meets the downwards slope to Maesteg. Drivers had to be very careful and had to come out of the tunnel at a walking pace; if they came out too fast, the train would build up momentum and would hurtle down the valley without any chance of slowing it down or stopping it; the only way would be to run the train onto a side track; there was one at Ty'n-y-Fferm. On one occasion the wagons piled up, and coal was spilt everywhere. The opening of the PTR really brought Bryn into the outside world. Although originally for coal, the line later had a passenger service which would take passengers to Port Talbot or Maesteg and later main line connections to the seaside.

The passenger life only lasted 30 years; the service was put in peril in the 1920s when the main road was constructed from Port Talbot to Bryn and Maesteg. The Llynfi Motor Company offered strong competition to the service with the advances in personal transport. It had a bus depot in Bryn, which was demolished in 2008. They operated a Daimler CK, which cost £800 in 1924. The price of a single ticket between Maesteg and Caerau was 2d, and a return to Port Talbot was 1s 2d. The Lynfi buses served the village for 60 years; when the last of the brothers died in 1988 it was then taken over by brewers. After brewers it became South Wales Transport. First Cymru now operates a bus service in the village every hour as of 2009; before that, buses used to be every 30 minutes, but with the economic downturn, cost-cutting measures and the increase of personal transport have threatened its service.

X3: Swansea - Maesteg Via Westlands, Port Talbot, Ynysygwas & Bryn
 : Marker Stone

Chapels and churches
There are many different places of worship in Bryn, although the number is still in decline. Some have been demolished, some have been turned into dwellings and some left to ruins.

Bryn Seion

In 1840 the Bryn Methodists who were attending services at Dyffryn and Pontrhydyfen decided to have their own place of worship. They took over a small mill (Y Felin Fach) on the west bank of Nant Ffrwdwyllt opposite Farteg Fawr farm. It was a derelict building which they restored and converted and used with payment of a rent of 1s a year. It was a simple thatched roof with a few rough benches. As more houses were built to accommodate workers that came to the village, the mill had reached full capacity. A larger chapel was clearly needed, and so a plot of land was bought from the Talbot estate on higher ground above the mill which became chapel terrace. The chapel opened in 1856.

In 1914 the old 'Seion' chapel was demolished, and a new one was built in its place at a cost of between £1,600 and £1,700. After many years of discussion, a vestry was built and opened in 1929. By 1986 the membership had dropped to 10, and therefore it became impossible to continue, and the chapel was closed in October that year. The vestry has been converted into a bungalow, and the church had soon after got demolished.

Jerusalem Chapel (Welsh baptist)

The first Baptists appeared in Bryn in 1848, services were held in a barn belonging to the colliery company, probably near Coalyard Row. It had 40 members and 40 in Sunday school. There was a very bad case of Cholera in 1849, and a surge in religious activity helped to establish a Baptist Chapel. This was the second chapel in Bryn. Built in 1858 with seating for 120 downstairs and 80 upstairs, the chapel had a boost of 45 members in 1859–60.

Baptisms took place in the stream below Meadow Row, certainly up until 1900. Pollution from the colliery stopped the tradition. It was replaced with a well under the 'big seat' of the chapel.

Members of the chapel had to pay weekly for the rental of chapel seats; this stopped in 1970. Tickets were given out during singing schools, held after the evening service. Only those with a good attendance were allowed to go up to the gallery to sing. In its heyday the members would produce dramas and operas; Mayor John Harry Jones was one of the members and also became its secretary. The chapel is now a grade 2 listed building which was turned into a dwelling in 2003.

Carmel Chapel

The Carmel chapel opened in 1860. It was founded for the need of more room, with the increase of workers used in the collieries. Members of the Seion helped to dig the foundations which would help lower building costs that totals £196. Of this money, £121 was collected in advance and the rest was to be paid in 6 years. In 1869 £70 was spent on improving the building, with this being paid by 1877, fortunately before the first colliery closed; when many of its members left the village in search for jobs, membership fell to only 14. Although when Bryn Navigation colliery began sinking in 1902 the chapel had a much-needed boost of followers.

Eventually it was decided to build a new chapel. The first part, completed in 1928, was intended to be a vestry, with the second floor to be added later to constitute the chapel itself. Again, economic depression in the 1930s interfered with the plans, and with the cost totalling £1750 for the 80 strong members, the decision was made to continue to use the vestry building as the chapel.
Today, after its closure, another chapel in Bryn has been turned into a dwelling.

The English Baptist Chapel

This is the youngest church in Bryn, the formation service was held in 1917 when the chapel was accepted into the English Baptist Association; at that time they had 13 members, against a devastating war in Europe and the Middle East.

The Apostolic Church

The first Apostolic church was founded in Bryn in 1926. It first used the ambulance room which was owned by the Bryn colliery; its services were every Thursday and Sunday. A new church was built near the old co-op; at its strongest point it had a membership of 58 and finally closed in 1953. All these places of worship were a center for culture, with children being taught Welsh and sol-fa, which were important at the time when the school was regarded as national (church school).

St Tydfil's

This church was one of the many benefactions of Miss Emily Charlotte Talbot, to whom the ownership of the Talbot estate passed on the death of her father in 1980. Even before the church was constructed, there were church worshipers in the village; they used the old school room adjoining Bryn farm. They took the initiative to send a petition to Talbot for the provision for a church in Bryn, possibly for her generosity in founding St Theodores in 1897. Talbot responded wholeheartedly, and not only committed herself to pay for the church (£5,500), but also the parsonage (£1,100) and the church hall built in 1915 for (£760). On 15 May 1902 a legal document was completed for the usage of the land which the church had already been built upon. On the afternoon of Thursday, 30 August 1900, the foundation stone was laid by Talbot. The church was completed in 1902.

The Royal Oak Inn

Bryn acquired its first public house in 1850, it was at the lower end of Farteg Row, which in the 1851 census was listed as number 13. It is not known whether it was originally built to be a public house or whether it was converted. It is most likely to have been converted, as the population of Bryn greatly increased by 1841. It was named the 'Royal Oak Inn' (1851) then 'No 1 lower Bryn Coliery Cottages' (1861) 'then 13 Farteg Row' (1871), and to avoid any more confusion it was finally named '13 Farteg Row, Royal Oak Public House' (1881). Griffith Rowland was its innkeeper until he died in 1874. His wife Ann Rowland became its successor. The family have another connection in the village, Rowland cottages were built in 1861 by Griffith Rowland; number 2, 3 and 4 were built at first, with number 1 being built at a later date. These cottages were intended to house Griffith's daughters. One of his daughters, Margaret, lived at number 4 with her husband Thomas Daniel, until her mother died in 1883, and they took over the Royal Oak Inn.

The family remained the licencees until the new pub was opened in 1898. They stayed at the new pub until 1928 when they retired and ended a 70-year chapter for the Rowlands. The old pub was lived in until the 1950s when it was demolished. To this day, the new pub is still a public house which serves homemade food.

Community

Bryn was once a very self-contained village with its own petrol station and numerous shops, as well as having a brickworks and a various coal mines. With the advances of more modern transport, the people of Bryn now had the luxury to travel to the nearby towns of Port Talbot and Maesteg to shop; with the improved PTR day trips were becoming the norm to the seaside of Aberavon and Porthcawl. Bryn still has a shop that contains basic essentials as well as newspapers and confectionery items. The local post office closed around 2006.

Two World Wars

Bryn also served as a camp for the British Royal Artillery during WW2. Bunkers can still be seen today. Many men were stationed here. The CO (commanding officer) had his private bunker.

WRC GB
The Port Talbot (Margam) stage of the World Rally GB used to pass through Bryn and finish in Margam park, although they had been known to change the course to drive the opposite way. It now runs in North Wales.

Media
Bryn has been featured on BBC Wales News when many local residents had seen and captured on film a mysterious large cat, "The beast of Bryn".

References

External links
www.geograph.co.uk : photos of Bryn and surrounding area
: Bryn Village Website
www.neath-porttalbot.gov.uk : Council page for bryn
www.biglotteryfund.org.uk : Peoples millions
www.brynprimaryschool.ik.org : Bryn primary school website
9WR www.accuweather.com : Weather in Bryn
Bryn Residents Action Group - pictures of past coal mines at Bryn

Villages in Neath Port Talbot
Communities in Neath Port Talbot
Afan Valley